Justine Wong-Orantes (born October 6, 1995) is an American volleyball player. She is a libero. In 2021, she became a gold medalist at both the 2020 Summer Olympics in Tokyo and the Volleyball Nations League in Rimini.

Career

Early life and high school
Wong-Orantes is of Chinese descent on her mother's side and of Mexican descent on her father's side. Both of her parents, Winnie Wong and Robert Orantes, were volleyball players. Her father also coached the Mizuno Long Beach volleyball club.

She was an accomplished beach volleyball player from a young age, partnering with Sara Hughes and appearing on "Volleyball" magazine covers at age 12, after winning a prestigious beach volleyball California tournament. She was the youngest female to ever earn an AAA rating in beach volleyball. She attended high school at Los Alamitos High School in Cypress, California, where as an indoor player, her position was setter where she led her Long Beach-based club team to a national title.

Due to her being considered undersized at 5'6", she was not heavily recruited coming out of high school by top volleyball schools. It wasn't until she was attending a high school club tournament, when the head coach got tired of so many balls dropping easily and asked her to put on a libero jersey. Nebraska head coach John Cook happened to be at the tournament and watched her play in her first ever match as libero. He saw potential in her, invited her for a visit to campus, where she eventually committed to play.

University of Nebraska
She would complete her collegiate career at Nebraska in both beach and indoor volleyball. In indoor volleyball, she won several accolades including AVCA First Team All-American in 2016, Third Team All-American in 2015, was a two time Big Ten Defensive Player of the Year in 2015 & 2016, and finished her career as Nebraska's all-time career digs leader with 1,890. She helped her team win the 2015 NCAA national championship.

USA National Team
She played for the United States national team since 2017, winning the Pan American gold medal, and the bronze medal at the 2017 FIVB Volleyball World Grand Prix.

In May 2021, she was named to the 18-player roster for the FIVB Volleyball Nations League tournament that was played in Rimini, Italy. It was the only major international competition before the Tokyo Olympics in July. She was named the best libero of the tournament after helping Team USA win its third straight gold medal.

On June 7, 2021, US National Team head coach Karch Kiraly announced she would be part of the 12-player Olympic roster for the 2020 Summer Olympics in Tokyo. In her Olympic debut, Wong-Orantes led the Olympics in serve reception percentage, on the way to helping the USA capture its first-ever gold medal. She was named the best Libero of the Olympics.

Professional clubs
  Schweriner SC (2019–2020)
  VC Wiesbaden (2020–2022)
  Béziers Volley (2022–present)

International awards
2021 FIVB Nations League - "Best Libero"
2020 Summer Olympics - "Best Libero"

References

1995 births
Living people
American people of Chinese descent
American people of Filipino descent
American people of Mexican descent
American expatriate volleyball players
American expatriate sportspeople in Germany
American women's volleyball players
Expatriate volleyball players in Germany
Nebraska Cornhuskers women's beach volleyball players
Nebraska Cornhuskers women's volleyball players
Liberos
Volleyball players at the 2020 Summer Olympics
Olympic gold medalists for the United States in volleyball
Medalists at the 2020 Summer Olympics
American women's beach volleyball players
American expatriate sportspeople in France
Expatriate volleyball players in France